Prigorje is a geographical subdivision of Croatia

Prigorje may also refer to:

Prigorje County, a county of the Independent State of Croatia
, a village in Croatia
Prigorje Brdovečko, Zagreb County, a village in Croatia